Richland Furnace State Forest is a state forest in Jackson and Vinton counties in the U.S. state of Ohio.

References

External Links
 U.S. Geological Survey Map at the U.S. Geological Survey Map Website. Retrieved November 6, 2022.

Ohio state forests
Protected areas of Jackson County, Ohio
Protected areas of Vinton County, Ohio